Lawnton may refer to:
 Lawnton, Queensland, a suburb of the Moreton Bay Region of South East Queensland, Australia
Lawnton railway station
 Lawnton, Pennsylvania